The Beryozovaya is a river in Perm Krai, Russia, a left tributary of the Kolva. It starts on slopes of mountain range Beryozovy Kamen and flows through Cherdynsky District. Its mouth is downstream of the village Korepino. There are many rocks and limestone formations along its banks.

Main tributaries:
 Left:  Zhernovka;
 Right: Byrkim, Vizhay, Buzhuy, Kremennaya, Nemyd.

References

Rivers of Perm Krai